Bogdanovdol is a village in Southern Bulgaria. The village is located in Pernik Municipality, Pernik Province. Аccording to the numbers provided by the 2020 Bulgarian census, Bogdanovdol currently has a population of 569 people with a permanent address registration in the settlement.

Geography 
Bogdanovdol village is located in Southern Bulgaria. The major part of the village's eastern area is occupied by agricultural lands. Near the southern part of the land area of the village, the main road between Breznik and Tran passes. There is also a river that passes through the territory - Konska Reka.

The elevation in the village varies between 600 and 900 meters with an average of 700 meters. The climate of the village is continental. It lies on the borders of the Balkan Mountains.

There is a very well-developed vegetable production, and fruit growing in the village.

Culture 
The village's first mention dates back to the Middle Ages. The name of the village originates from the legend that the first person who settled in the area bore the name of Bogdan, thus Bogdanovdol.

Ethnicity 
According to the Bulgarian population census in 2011.

References 

Villages in Pernik Province